Mystery Mountain Winter Park is a small ski park in Mystery Lake, Manitoba, Canada. It is located 20 minutes north of Thompson on Highway Provincial Road 280.

It is run by the not-for-profit organization, Thompson Ski Club Inc. It has 18 runs and 5 lifts.

References

External links
 
Parks in Northern Manitoba
Ski areas and resorts in Manitoba